Johnson v. Robison, 415 U.S. 361 (1974), was a case heard before the United States Supreme Court. The court held that the Veterans' Administrations' allocation of greater educational benefits to combat veterans than conscientious objectors was consistent with the United States Constitution. Robison, a conscientious objector, argued that such unequal benefits violated his 5th Amendment right to Equal Protection and his First Amendment right to free exercise of religion. The court rejected both arguments.

Opinion of the Court 
The court reasoned that a rational basis existed to give combat veterans better benefits than those who objected for religious reasons: namely, encouraging people to participate in the armed forces as soldiers. The court reasoned that the increased disruption and longer commitment for soldiers justified disparate allocation of benefits. As to free exercise, the court held that the withholding of benefits had only an incidental burden, if any, on religious exercise, that that burden was not intended, and that it was justified by the substantial government interest in raising an army.

The Court also held that 38 USC section 211(a) does not preclude constitutional challenges to law administered by the Veteran's Administration.

External links
 

United States Supreme Court cases
United States Supreme Court cases of the Burger Court
United States administrative case law
American conscientious objectors
1974 in United States case law